Georgetown is a town in Madison County, New York, United States. The population was 974 at the 2010 census.

The Town of Georgetown is on the southern border of the county.

History 
The town was first settled around 1804. The town was organized from part of the Town of DeRuyter in 1815.

The Spirit House was listed on the National Register of Historic Places in 2006.

Geography
The southern town line is the border of Chenango County.

Demographics

As of the census of 2000, there were 946 people, 249 households, and 195 families residing in the town. The population density was 23.6 people per square mile (9.1/km2). There were 315 housing units at an average density of 7.9 per square mile (3.0/km2). The racial makeup of the town was 79.81% White, 15.54% African American, 0.42% Native American, 3.59% from other races, and 0.63% from two or more races. Hispanic or Latino of any race were 7.51% of the population.

There were 249 households, out of which 34.9% had children under the age of 18 living with them, 65.5% were married couples living together, 7.6% had a female householder with no husband present, and 21.3% were non-families. 16.5% of all households were made up of individuals, and 7.2% had someone living alone who was 65 years of age or older. The average household size was 2.82 and the average family size was 3.18.

In the town, the population was spread out, with 21.6% under the age of 18, 9.1% from 18 to 24, 40.2% from 25 to 44, 20.9% from 45 to 64, and 8.2% who were 65 years of age or older. The median age was 36 years. For every 100 females, there were 172.6 males. For every 100 females age 18 and over, there were 189.8 males.

The median income for a household in the town was $37,963, and the median income for a family was $38,804. Males had a median income of $21,726 versus $22,000 for females. The per capita income for the town was $11,825. About 7.5% of families and 11.4% of the population were below the poverty line, including 18.9% of those under age 18 and 6.9% of those age 65 or over.

Communities and locations in Georgetown 
Georgetown – The hamlet of Georgetown, at the junction of Routes NY-26, 64, and NY-80. The community was known to locals as "Slab City."
Georgetown Station – A location in the northeastern part of the town.
Otselic Creek – A stream flowing through the town.

Notable person
Eli Hawks, Wisconsin State Assemblyman and businessman, was born in Georgetown.

References

External links
  Early Georgetown history

Syracuse metropolitan area
1815 establishments in New York (state)
Towns in Madison County, New York
Populated places established in the 1810s